Vivekananda College, established in 1986, is a general degree college in Madhyamgram, Kolkata, India. It offers undergraduate courses in arts and Science. The college is awarded grade "A" by National Assessment and Accreditation Council (NAAC). It is affiliated to West Bengal State University.

Location
It stands on the eastern side of the Jessore Road, National Highway 34, about 1 km from either Madhyamgram or Hridaypur railway station on Sealdah-Bongaon section. It is 18 km from Kolkata and is connected with the city, the capital of West Bengal, by bus routes and train services.

Infrastructure
The college has its own building (two storied) and women's hostel, canteen for student and staff surrounded by boundary walls. The library opens on working days from 10 am to 5 pm.

Departments

Arts
Bengali
English 
Education
Geography
History
Philosophy
Political Science
Journalism and Mass Communication
Mathemati
Computer Science

National Service scheme
The college has opened an NSS unit under the supervision of the college authority.

Accreditation
Vivekananda College is recognized by the University Grants Commission (UGC) and the college is awarded with A grade by NAAC.

See also
Education in India
List of colleges in West Bengal
Education in West Bengal

References

External links

Educational institutions established in 1986
Colleges affiliated to West Bengal State University
Universities and colleges in North 24 Parganas district
1986 establishments in West Bengal